MITMOT ("Mac and mImo Technologies for More Throughput") proposal for IEEE 802.11n, the high throughput Wi-Fi MIMO standard has been initiated jointly by Motorola and Mitsubishi in order to propose a new PHY and MAC layer specification competing with WWiSE and TGnSync proposals addressing the need for integration of Wi-Fi chipsets into mobile phones.

MITMOT high throughput Wi-Fi IEEE802.11n proposal features 

This proposal was motivated by the fact that according to latest market forecasts, in 2009 one third of the mobile phones will be Wi-Fi enabled which corresponds to 200 million units sold per year to be compared to a 70 million Wi-Fi PCs volume. Thus handsets will soon capture the predominant share of the entire Wi-Fi market. IEEE 802.11n thus has to mark an evolution from the IEEE IT-centric focus towards finally capturing both the consumer electronic and handset industry technical requirements. 
To anticipate and contribute to this change, according to MITMOT proposal summary, it has introduced the following technical features to enable a better support of handsets: 
 Built-in support for asymmetric antenna configurations to accommodate various terminal sizes (Phone/PDA/PC) offering a scalable and evolutionary solution using space time block codes
 Exploit the spatial diversity provided by MIMO not only to increase the peak data rate but also to grant range extension for indoor/limited outdoor operation (i.e. SOHO, corporate enterprise networks, and public "hotspots")
 Support heterogeneous traffic: increase overall peak data rate without jeopardizing lower data rates modes
 Focus on simple and proved technologies by considering low complexity open-loop MIMO solutions
 Enhance support for low power operation to offer comparable battery lifetime to existing cellular phones with increased throughput efficiency compared to IEEE 802.11e

The TGn group of IEEE 802.11 after having suspended the down-selection process in order to allow the merging of the remaining candidate proposals: WWiSE, TGnSync and MITMOT into a single Joint Proposal (JP), has elected at the January 2006 IEEE 802.11 Hawaii meeting the resulting proposal containing handset features as the task group draft.

External links and references 

 MITMOT IEEE802.11n presentation: IEEE802 standard document 11-04-1369-07-000n and 11-05-0735-00-000n
 MITMOT IEEE802.11n specification: IEEE802 standard document 11-04-1372-06-000n
 IEEE802.11n standard process status: http://grouper.ieee.org/groups/802/11/Reports/tgn_update.htm

Telecommunications standards
Networking standards